Chaff is the dry, scaly protective casing of the seeds of cereal grains or similar fine, dry, scaly plant material (such as scaly parts of flowers or finely chopped straw). Chaff is indigestible by humans, but livestock can eat it. In agriculture it is used as livestock fodder, or is a waste material ploughed into the soil or burned.

Etymology

"Chaff" comes from Middle English chaf, from Old English , related to Old High German cheva, "husk".

Grain chaff

In grasses (including cereals such as rice, barley, oats, and wheat), the ripe seed is surrounded by thin, dry, scaly bracts (called glumes, lemmas and paleas), forming a dry husk (or hull) around the grain. Once it is removed it is often referred to as chaff.

In wild cereals and in the primitive domesticated einkorn, emmer and spelt wheats, the husks enclose each seed tightly. Before the grain can be used, the husks must be removed.

The process of loosening the chaff from the grain so as to remove it is called threshing – traditionally done by milling or pounding. Separating remaining loose chaff from the grain is called winnowing – traditionally done by repeatedly tossing the grain up into a light wind which gradually blows the lighter chaff away. This method typically utilizes a broad, plate-shaped basket or similar receptacle to hold and collect the winnowed grain as it falls back down.

Domesticated grains such as durum wheat and common wheat have been bred to have chaff that is easily removed. These varieties are known as free-threshing or naked.

Chaff should not be confused with bran, which is finer scaly material that is part of the grain itself.

Straw chaff
Chaff is also made by chopping straw (or sometimes coarse hay) into very short lengths, using a machine called a chaff cutter.  Like grain chaff this is used as animal feed, and is a way of turning coarse fodder into a form more palatable to livestock.

Botany
In botany, chaff refers to the thin receptacular bracts of many species in the sunflower family Asteraceae and related families. They are modified scale-like leaves surrounding single florets in the flower-head.

Metaphor
Chaff as a waste product from grain processing leads to a metaphorical use of the term, to refer to something seen as worthless. In the Bible, such use is found in Job 13:25, Isaiah 33:11, Psalm 83:13-15, and other places. Chaff also lends its name to a radar countermeasure, composed of small particles dropped from an aircraft.

Use
Hungarian engineer László Schremmer has discovered that the use of chaff-based filters can reduce the arsenic content of water to 3 microgram/litre. This is especially important in areas where the potable water is provided by filtering the water extracted from an underground aquifer.

See also
 Awn (botany)
 Bran
 Biomass
 Combine harvester
 Rice hulls
 Rice huller

References

Plant morphology
Fodder
Waste

ca:Espícula#Glumel·les